Colonel Lord  Algernon Charles Gordon-Lennox (19 September 1847 – 3 October 1921) was a British army officer.

Life 
Gordon-Lennox was educated at Eton. He served in the Royal Navy between 1862–65. In 1867, he joined 1st Life Guards and, in 1867, transferred to Grenadier Guards. He served with 2nd Battalion Grenadier Guards in Anglo-Egyptian War in 1882. He was the Aide-de-Camp to Prince George, Duke of Cambridge, 1883–95. He served in South Africa in 1900 as Military Secretary to Sir Alfred Milner, and latterly on the staff of Hugh Trenchard, 1st Viscount Trenchard.

Family 
Gordon-Lennox was born to Charles Gordon-Lennox, 6th Duke of Richmond and Frances Harriett Greville, daughter of Algernon Greville.

He married Blanche Maynard, daughter of  Charles Henry Maynard and Blanche ( Fitzroy) Maynard. Blanche's paternal grandfather was Henry Maynard, 3rd Viscount Maynard. Blanche Maynard Gordon-Lennox would later be appointed Dame Commander of the Order of the British Empire (DBE) in 1919.

The couple had one child: Ivy.

References 

1847 births
1921 deaths
People educated at Eton College
British Life Guards officers
Grenadier Guards officers
Younger sons of dukes
British Army personnel of the Anglo-Egyptian War
British Army personnel of the Second Boer War
People from Marylebone
Military personnel from London